Savage River is a small Australian mining village located on the west coast of Tasmania.

History
Government surveyor Charles Sprent discovered Savage River's iron ore deposits in 1877, however the minerals were left untouched for nearly a century due to the difficulty in extracting iron from the low-quality ore. Several surveys were conducted in the interim including one in 1926 by Australian Iron & Steel. The township at Savage River was constructed from 1965 to 1967 when Roy Hudson's Industrial and Mining Investigations Pty Ltd received backing to construct a mining project in the area.

Savage River Post Office opened on 23 November 1967.

Mining operations
The Savage River Mine is an open-cut iron ore mine operated by Grange Resources. Production at the mine in 2006–07 was 1.423 million cubic metres of ore with 4.851 million cubic metres of waste. At June 2007, 50.9% of the 323.8 million tonnes of resources from the mine was recoverable magnetite. The iron ore is piped as slurry north to the coast at Port Latta for on-shipment.

Climate

References

Localities of Waratah–Wynyard Council
Mining towns in Tasmania